XDefiant (formerly known as Tom Clancy's XDefiant) is an upcoming free-to-play multiplayer first-person arena shooter video game set to be released by French publisher Ubisoft. In March 2022, the game was rebranded as "A Ubisoft Original", dropping the Tom Clancy's universe title, and is expected to feature characters from other Ubisoft franchises.

The setting of the game revolves around factions called "Defiant", Wolves (from Ghost Recon), Echelon (from Splinter Cell), and the Outcasts and Cleaners (from The Division). Defiants are customizable with traits, abilities, devices, weapons and items. It has 6-versus-6 linear game modes (such as “Domination” and “Escort”). The game has punk visual art elements.

A closed test of a pre-alpha version of XDefiant occurred in North America in 2021. A second test was held in February 2023.

References

External links 
 

Cancelled Stadia games
First-person shooters
Multiplayer online games
PlayStation 4 games
PlayStation 5 games
Tom Clancy games
Ubisoft games
Upcoming video games
Video games developed in the United States
Windows games
Xbox One games
Xbox Series X and Series S games